Iron County is a county located in the U.S. state of Wisconsin. As of the 2020 census, the population was 6,137, making it the third-least populous county in Wisconsin. Its county seat is Hurley. It was named for the valuable iron ore found within its borders. The county overlaps with small parts of the Bad River and Lac du Flambeau Indian reservations.

Geography

Adjacent counties
 Vilas County - east, southeast
 Price County - southwest
 Ashland County - west
 Gogebic County, Michigan - northeast

Major highways

County Highways

Railroads
Watco

Buses
List of intercity bus stops in Wisconsin

Airport
 KIWD - Gogebic-Iron County Airport –  Commercial air service is available.

Demographics

2020 census
As of the census of 2020, the population was 6,137. The racial makeup of the county was 95.0% White, 1.1% Native American, 0.3% Black or African American, 0.2% Asian, 0.7% from other races, and 2.8% from two or more races. Ethnically, the population was 1.2% Hispanic or Latino of any race.

2010 census
As of the 2010 United States Census, there were 5,916 people living in the county. 97.9% were White, 0.6% Native American, 0.3% Asian, 0.1% Black or African American, 0.2% of some other race and 0.9% of two or more races. 0.6% were Hispanic or Latino (of any race). 22.9% were of German, 13.7% Italian, 12.6% Finnish, 8.2% Polish, 6.6% American and 5.4% Irish ancestry.

2000 census

As of the census of 2000, there were 6,861 people, 3,083 households, and 1,960 families living in the county.  The population density was 9 people per square mile (4/km2).  There were 5,706 housing units at an average density of 8 per square mile (3/km2).  The racial makeup of the county was 98.28% White, 0.09% Black or African American, 0.60% Native American, 0.13% Asian, 0.04% Pacific Islander, 0.06% from other races, and 0.80% from two or more races.  0.66% of the population were Hispanic or Latino of any race. 20.9% were of German, 18.6% Italian, 15.2% Finnish, 9.3% Polish and 6.4% Irish ancestry. 97.1% spoke English as their first language.

There were 3,083 households, out of which 22.20% had children under the age of 18 living with them, 53.00% were married couples living together, 7.00% had a female householder with no husband present, and 36.40% were non-families. 32.00% of all households were made up of individuals, and 16.30% had someone living alone who was 65 years of age or older.  The average household size was 2.19 and the average family size was 2.74.

In the county, the population was spread out, with 19.40% under the age of 18, 5.90% from 18 to 24, 24.70% from 25 to 44, 26.80% from 45 to 64, and 23.20% who were 65 years of age or older.  The median age was 45 years. For every 100 females there were 96.10 males.  For every 100 females age 18 and over, there were 96.80 males.

In 2017, there were 34 births, giving a general fertility rate of 46.1 births per 1000 women aged 15–44, the 2nd lowest rate out of 72 Wisconsin counties. 13 of the births were to unmarried mothers, 21 were to married mothers. Additionally, there were no reported induced abortions performed on women of Iron County residence in 2017.

Communities

Cities
 Hurley (county seat)
 Montreal

Towns

 Anderson
 Carey
 Gurney
 Kimball
 Knight
 Mercer
 Oma
 Pence
 Saxon
 Sherman

Census-designated places
 Iron Belt
 Mercer
 Pence
 Saxon

Unincorporated communities

 Carter
 Cedar
 Germania
 Gurney
 Hoyt
 Kimball
 Manitowish
 Pine Lake
 Orva
 Powell
 Rouse
 Springstead
 Tyler Forks
 Upson
 Van Buskirk

Historical sites
The National Register of Historic Places lists the following historic sites in Iron County:

Politics
From 1928 to 1996, Iron County voted Democratic in presidential elections, the only exception being Richard Nixon's landslide in 1972. In 2000, George W. Bush became only the second Republican since 1920 to carry Iron County despite narrowly losing the national popular vote, and the county remained a competitive county for the next three elections, narrowly voting for Kerry in 2004 and for Romney in 2012. Recent elections have seen the county trend solidly Republican however; in 2016, Trump won the county with 59.2% (the first time a Republican had won an outright majority in the county since 1920), and in 2020, he increased his vote share to 60.8%.

See also
 National Register of Historic Places listings in Iron County, Wisconsin

References

Further reading
 History of Iron County. Hurley, Wis.: Iron County WPA Historical Project, 1937–1938.

External links
 Iron County government website
 Iron County map from the Wisconsin Department of Transportation
 Iron County Economic Development
 Historic Bridges of Iron County

 
1893 establishments in Wisconsin
Populated places established in 1893